The Concert is a 1931 German comedy film based upon the play by Hermann Bahr, directed by Leo Mittler and starring Olga Chekhova, Oskar Karlweis, and Ursula Grabley. It was made by the German subsidiary of Paramount Pictures and released by UFA as part of the Parufamet distribution deal. It was shot at the Joinville Studios in Paris and premiered at the Gloria-Palast in Berlin.

Plot 
Professor Gustav Heink is a pianist and music teacher who is adored by his students, although he is no longer quite young. For decades, he has been married to Marie, who bears his idiosyncrasies quietly and tolerantly. Heink loves to flirt with young women. This gives him the self-affirmation that he is still young, attractive and desired. Between him and his wife, who still loves him dearly, a code has developed for this circumstance. When the master, as his students call him full of admiration, gives a “private concert” again, this means nothing other than that Prof. Heink wants to have another affair, an extramarital sweetheart. Marie Heink has come to terms with this fait accompli and suffers quietly. The aging piano virtuoso assumes that his tolerant wife has no objections. Heink's latest conquest is called Delfine Jura and is associated with the young scientist Dr. Franz Jura married.

A liaison with a married woman? - that has never happened with Heink before, and so the two victims of this affair, Marie Heink and Delfine's husband Franz, decide after he, like her, from Heink's music student Eva Gerndl, who herself has had an eye on the pianist, about the affair were informed to intervene this time. Because of course, instead of touring, it's actually going to the music professor's love nest, a remote, lonely mountain hut run by the loyal Pollinger couple. Franz and Marie have come up with a clever plan: the two unfaithful people are told that they, Franz and Marie, have fallen in love with each other and that this shouldn't be a problem for the spouses, since Heink and Delfine would also be a couple. Suddenly, the pianist and his apprentice are no longer so sure about this and their passion for each other cools down noticeably. Jura and Marie have achieved what they wanted: Delfine returns to her charming husband, and Professor Heink finally understands what he has in his Marie.

Cast

References

Bibliography

External links 
 

1931 films
1931 comedy films
German comedy films
1930s German-language films
Films directed by Leo Mittler
German black-and-white films
UFA GmbH films
Paramount Pictures films
German films based on plays
1930s German films
Films shot at Joinville Studios